Chinak Kurmi is a Nepalese politician, belonging to the Socialist Party of Nepal. 

During the Nepal Civil War, Kurmi was arrested. He was released in 2003. In the 2008 Constituent Assembly election he was elected from the Nawalparasi-4 constituency, winning 10592 votes.

References

Living people
Nepalese atheists
Nepalese prisoners and detainees
Year of birth missing (living people)
People of the Nepalese Civil War
Members of the 1st Nepalese Constituent Assembly

Socialist Party of Nepal politicians